Joe Gandara (April 25, 1924 – June 9, 1944) was a U.S. Army veteran of World War II and recipient of the Medal of Honor.

Gandara was awarded the Medal of Honor by President Barack Obama in a March 18, 2014 ceremony in the White House. The award came through the Defense Authorization Act which called for a review of Jewish American and Hispanic American veterans from World War II, the Korean War and the Vietnam War to ensure that no prejudice was shown to those deserving the Medal of Honor.

Biography
Gandara, who was the son of Mexican immigrants, joined the Army from Los Angeles in February 1943.

According to Gandara's U.S. Army's biography:
Gandara was born in Santa Monica, California, on April 25, 1924.
Gandara was bestowed the Medal of Honor to recognize his heroic actions on June 9, 1944, in Amfreville, France. His detachment came under devastating enemy fire from a strong German force, pinning the men to the ground for a period of four hours. Gandara advanced voluntarily and alone toward the enemy position and destroyed three hostile machine-guns before he was fatally wounded.
Gandara received the Medal of Honor, Bronze Star Medal, Purple Heart, Army Good Conduct Medal, European-African-Middle Eastern Campaign Medal with one Bronze Service Star and Bronze Arrowhead Device, Presidential Unit Citation, French Fourragere (Couleur à préciser), Combat Infantryman Badge and Parachutist Badge-Basic with one Bronze Service Star.

Medal of Honor citation

Legacy
Stewart Street Park, a 3.8 acre residential park located in Santa Monica, California,  was renamed Gandara Park in his honor in 2017.

References

1925 births
1944 deaths
United States Army personnel killed in World War II
American people of Mexican descent
People from Santa Monica, California
Military personnel from California
United States Army Medal of Honor recipients
United States Army soldiers
World War II recipients of the Medal of Honor
Battle of Normandy recipients of the Medal of Honor